Edward Joseph Cotterill (27 June 1856 – 26 April 1904) was a New Zealand cricketer who played first-class cricket for Canterbury from 1881 to 1889, and one match for Auckland in 1896.

Edward Cotterill was one of the 17 children of the Rev. George Cotterill, who became Canon of Christchurch. He was educated at Christ's College from 1865 to 1873.

Cotterill was a right-handed batsman. When he made his highest score of 75 not out in Canterbury's victory over Otago in 1885–86, it was the highest score of the short New Zealand first-class season. He captained Canterbury against Otago in 1888–89, scoring 45 in an innings victory. At this point in his career, after five first-class matches, he had scored 202 runs at an average of 50.50.

He also played football, representing Canterbury as a goalkeeper. He spent his working life with the Union Bank, mostly in Christchurch but with a period in Auckland. He died in Christchurch on 26 April 1904, and was buried at the Barbadoes Street Cemetery.

See also
 List of Auckland representative cricketers

References

External links
 
 Edward Cotterill at CricketArchive

1856 births
1904 deaths
New Zealand cricketers
Auckland cricketers
Canterbury cricketers
New Zealand association footballers
Cricketers from Christchurch
People educated at Christ's College, Christchurch
Burials at Barbadoes Street Cemetery
Association football goalkeepers